Admiral Sir Herbert William Richmond,  (15 September 1871 – 15 December 1946) was a prominent Royal Navy officer, described as "perhaps the most brilliant naval officer of his generation." He was also a top naval historian, known as the "British Mahan", the leader of the British Royal Navy's intellectual revolution that stressed continuing education especially in naval history as essential to the formation of naval strategy.  After serving as a "gadfly" to the British Admiralty, his constructive criticisms causing him to be "denied the role in the formation of policy and the reformations of naval education which his talents warranted", he served as Vere Harmsworth Professor of Imperial and Naval History at Cambridge University from 1934 to 1936, and Master of Downing College, Cambridge from 1934 to 1946.

Personal life
Richmond was the second son of artist Sir William Blake Richmond, son of the portrait painter George Richmond. In July 1907 he married 
Florence Elsa, elder daughter of the writer Florence Bell and Sir Thomas Hugh Bell. She was half-sister of the diplomat Gertrude Bell.

Naval career
Richmond joined the Royal Navy as a cadet in 1885, serving on the Australian Station and in the Hydrographic Service before qualifying as a torpedo officer in 1897.

In 1900–1903 Richmond served in the flagship of the Channel Fleet . He was assigned to the Admiralty in 1906–08, where he served briefly as naval assistant to Admiral John Fisher, 1st Baron Fisher. In 1907, inspired by the work of civilian naval historian Julian Corbett, Richmond began archive research concerning the naval aspects of the War of the Austrian Succession, which he completed in 1914, but which was not published until 1920 due to the First World War.

In 1912 he founded the Naval Review in order to promote innovative thought within the Royal Navy.

In 1913 Richmond became assistant director of operations on the Admiralty's Naval Staff, where his frequent memoranda about deficiencies in naval strategy drew the disdain of First Lord of the Admiralty Winston Churchill, and when events proved him right, he was shoveled off as a liaison officer to the Italian Fleet in April 1915, returning from Taranto in September 1915.

In early 1917 Richmond lobbied hard for convoy protection of merchant shipping in the North Sea, but the Admiralty resisted despite mounting losses, waiting until the end of April to experiment. On 17 May 1917 Richmond's friend, Lieutenant Joseph M. Kenworthy had a meeting with British Prime Minister Lloyd George, in which he recommended that Richmond be appointed to his cabinet, to which Lloyd George replied "I have put his name to the Admiralty and they tell me he is only a paper man". On 20 May he met with him again, pressing him to no avail, with Lloyd George saying "If you could put a captain in a sufficiently strong position, Richmond is the man"; nothing came of it.

Flag officer
Promoted to rear admiral, Richmond was put in charge of the Senior Officers' Course at the Royal Naval College, Greenwich in 1920, which office was merged with the Presidency of the Royal Naval College itself in November 1922. In October 1923 he was assigned as commander-in-chief, East Indies Squadron. Promoted to vice admiral in 1925, he was created a Knight Commander of the Order of the Bath in the 1926 Birthday Honours. Returning to London in 1927, he became Commandant of the Imperial Defence College. In 1929 he was promoted to admiral and served as president of the International Conference on the Safety of Life at Sea.

Academic career
Following his forced retirement from the Royal Navy in 1931, the University of Cambridge appointed him Vere Harmsworth Professor of Imperial and Naval History, an academic chair he held from 1934 to 1936. In 1934 he was also elected master of Downing College, Cambridge, a post he held until his death in 1946. He delivered the Ford Lectures in English History at Oxford University in 1943 (for the academic year 1943/4). He never published a formal treatise on naval strategy.

In March 1942 Richmond published an article in The Fortnightly Review which charged that the British defeat in the Battle of Singapore in February 1942 was due to "the folly of not providing adequately for the command of the sea in a two-ocean war". In his last book 
Statesmen and Sea Power (1946), he charged that the defeat was sealed by "the illusion that a Two-Hemisphere Empire can be defended by a One-Hemisphere Navy".

Impact
On 28–29 September 1992 the Naval War College in Newport, Rhode Island gathered naval experts from around the world to examine the works of Richmond and Sir Julian Corbett in the post-Cold War context, resulting in the book Mahan is not Enough (1993), which includes the article "Process: The Realities of Formulating Modern Naval Strategy" by Dr. David Alan Rosenberg, showing the importance of leveraging and integrating the expertise of naval historians with naval officers for a full understanding of naval strategy.

Works
 Papers Relating to the Loss of Menorca in 1756 (Navy Records Society, 1913) read online
 Private Papers of George, Second Earl Spencer, First Lord of the Admiralty, 1794–1801 (2 vols.) (Navy Records Society, 1914)
 The Navy in the War of 1739–48 (Cambridge University Press, 1920) read online
 Command and Discipline (1927)
 National Policy and Naval Strength and Other Essays by H.W. Richmond; with a foreword by Lord Sydenham of Combe, (New York: Longman, Green and Company, 1928, 1934, 1993) read online
 The Navy in India, 1763–1783 (1931)
 Economy and Naval Security : A Plea for the Examination of the Problem of the Reduction in the Cost of Naval Armaments on the Lines of Strategy and Policy (Ernest Benn Ltd., 1931) read online
 Imperial Defence and Capture at Sea in War (1932)
 Naval History and the Citizen: An Inaugural Lecture Delivered before the University on 25 April 1934 (Cambridge University Press, 1934) read online
 Sea Power in the Modern World (1934)
 The Navy (William Hodge, 1937) read online
 Statesmen and Sea Power The Ford Lectures (1946)
 The Navy as an Instrument of Policy, 1558–1727 Edited by E.A. Hughes. (1953)
 'How are we going to make war?' Admiral Sir Herbert Richmond and British Far Eastern War Plans by Christopher M. Bell  read online
 Admiral Sir Herbert Richmond by George Macaulay Trevelyan (Cumberledge, 1946) read online
 The Historical Lessons and Intellectual Rigour of Admiral Sir Herbert William Richmond by Commander Bruce McLennan read online

References

Secondary sources

External links
 
 
The War of 1739 to 1748 - Annotated typescript texts of seven lectures given by Richmond at the Royal Naval College, Portsmouth [Hampshire] on the War of the Austrian Succession

|-

|-
 

Royal Navy admirals
English naval historians
Fellows of Downing College, Cambridge
1871 births
1946 deaths
Admiral presidents of the Royal Naval College, Greenwich
Knights Commander of the Order of the Bath
Masters of Downing College, Cambridge
Fellows of the British Academy
Vere Harmsworth Professors of Imperial and Naval History
Dreadnought hoax
People from Hammersmith
Military personnel from London
Royal Navy personnel of World War I